Phalanx Mountain is a  summit located in Garibaldi Provincial Park of southwest British Columbia, Canada.

Description
Phalanx Mountain is the northernmost peak in the Spearhead Range, which is a subset of the Garibaldi Ranges of the Coast Mountains. Precipitation runoff and glacial meltwater from the east side of the peak drains to Wedge Creek, whereas the west slope drains to Blackcomb Creek, with both then eventually finding the Green River.

Etymology
The descriptive name for the mountain refers to the mountain resembling a Greek flying wedge of soldiers when viewed from the southwest or southeast, and this wedge formation is termed a phalanx. The mountain's toponym was officially adopted August 27, 1965, by the Geographical Names Board of Canada.

Climate
Based on the Köppen climate classification, Phalanx Mountain is located in the marine west coast climate zone of western North America. Most weather fronts originate in the Pacific Ocean, and travel east toward the Coast Mountains where they are forced upward by the range (Orographic lift), causing them to drop their moisture in the form of rain or snowfall. As a result, the Coast Mountains experience high precipitation, especially during the winter months in the form of snowfall. Winter temperatures can drop below −20 °C with wind chill factors below −30 °C. This climate supports the Blackcomb Glacier below the west slope, Spearhead Glacier on the southeast slope, and the Phalanx Glacier on the north slope. The months July through September offer the most favorable weather for climbing Phalanx Mountain.

Gallery

See also

 Geography of British Columbia
 Geology of British Columbia

References

External links
 Phalanx Mountain: weather forecast

Garibaldi Ranges
Two-thousanders of British Columbia
Sea-to-Sky Corridor
New Westminster Land District
Coast Mountains
Pacific Ranges